Semiozyorka is a rural locality (a selo) in Semiozyorsky Selsoviet of Ivanovsky District, Amur Oblast, Russia. The population was 590 as of 2018. There are 13 streets.

Geography 
Semiozyorka is located 40 km north of Ivanovka (the district's administrative centre) by road. Beryozovka is the nearest rural locality.

References 

Rural localities in Ivanovsky District, Amur Oblast